Kaitani Dam is a rockfill dam located in Fukui Prefecture in Japan. The dam is used for flood control. The catchment area of the dam is 1.1 km2. The dam impounds about 2  ha of land when full and can store 107 thousand cubic meters of water. The construction of the dam was started on 1972 and completed in 1977.

References

Dams in Fukui Prefecture